This list of U.S. states and territories by poverty rate covers the 50 U.S. states, the District of Columbia, and the territory of Puerto Rico and their populations' poverty rate. The four other inhabited U.S. territories (American Samoa, Guam, the Northern Mariana Islands, and the U.S. Virgin Islands) are listed separately.

The data source for the main list is the U.S. Census Bureau's five-year American Community Survey taken 2016 - 2020. The American Community Survey is a large demographic survey collected throughout the year using mailed questionnaires, telephone interviews, and visits from Census Bureau field representatives to about 3.5 million household addresses annually, regardless of their legal immigration status.

Overall, out of Americans for whom the Census Bureau was able to determine poverty status, 42.31 million lived below the poverty line (or 13.15% of the total population). Poverty rates were highest in the states of Mississippi (19.58%), Louisiana (18.65%), New Mexico (18.55%), West Virginia (17.10%), Kentucky (16.61%), and Arkansas (16.08%), and they were lowest in the states of New Hampshire (7.42%), Maryland (9.02%), Utah (9.13%), Hawaii (9.26%), and Minnesota (9.33%).

List

In the list below, the population in each state and territory of the U.S. by specific poverty status can be found. The list is initially sorted by poverty rate but the table headers can be clicked to sort by any column.

U.S. territories

Guam, the Northern Mariana Islands, and the U.S. Virgin Islands are data deficient (because they are not included in the American Community Survey), not all recent poverty rate estimates have been made for them. Below are the poverty rates for these territories in 2010.

Notes

These metrics are set at a federal level, and thus do not adjust for local cost of living metrics that vastly change purchasing power.  For useful metrics, look at census poverty rates that adjust for cost of living.

See also 
List of U.S. states and territories by income inequality
List of lowest-income places in the United States
List of lowest-income counties in the United States
Thank God for Mississippi

References

External links

 Total Number of People Living in Poverty based on Household Income (In Thousands), 2005. State Health Facts.  December 14, 2007.
 Poverty Rate based on Household Income, 2005  . State Health Facts.  December 14, 2007.
Geographic Adjustments of Supplemental Poverty Measure Thresholds: Using the American Community Survey Five-Year Data on Housing Costs Accessed November 27, 2012.
The Research Supplemental Poverty Measure Accessed June 5, 2014.

Poverty rate
Poverty Rate
Poverty in the United States
United States, Poverty rate